John Adolph of Schleswig-Holstein-Sonderburg-Norburg ( or ; 15 September 1576 – 21 February 1624), was a Duke of Norburg at Als. He was the son of John II of Schleswig-Holstein-Sonderburg and his wife Elizabeth of Brunswick-Grubenhagen. When his father died in 1622, he inherited the area around the Norburg on the island of Als and thus became the first Duke of Schleswig-Holstein-Sonderburg-Norburg. He went to Rome to study from 1596 to 1597, like his father had done.

He was engaged to Maria Hedwig, a daughter of Duke Ernest Louis of Pomerania-Wolgast. However, she died in 1606, before a marriage could take place. He remained unmarried.

John Adolph died in 1624. His brother Frederick inherited his title and his land.

External links 
 

1576 births
1624 deaths
Danish nobility
Dukes of Schleswig-Holstein-Sonderburg-Norburg